York House is a historic wing of St James's Palace, London, built for Frederick, Prince of Wales, on his marriage in 1736. It is in the north-western part of the palace on the site of a former suttling-house (canteen) for the Guards; it overlooks Ambassadors' Court and Cleveland Row to the west of the old Chapel Royal. Prince Frederick occupied it for about a year, until his quarrel with his father drove him from Court.

In 1795, Princess Caroline resided here before her marriage with the Prince of Wales, afterwards George IV. Prince Ernest Augustus, Duke of Cumberland, subsequently King of Hanover, lived here for a great many years; and the Duchess of Cambridge was identified with it from 1851 until her death in 1889. Later occupants included the future George V, the late Duke and Duchess of Gloucester from 1936 to 1970, and Princes Charles, William and Harry, who used it before moving to Clarence House.

As Edward, Prince of Wales, the future Edward VIII lived at York House, before his refurbishment of Fort Belvedere in Windsor Great Park.

The building includes a suite of somewhat low-pitched rooms on the ground-floor, several drawing-rooms on the first floor, a corridor in the rear, and the servants' rooms on the top storey; all facing Cleveland Row. The ceilings of the top floor are low, height having been sacrificed to that of the drawing-room floor; during the nineteenth century this was a common practice in London mansions.

The name York House has been used at various times for other houses occupied by various Dukes of York, including those now known as Cumberland House, Dover House, Lancaster House and The Albany.

References

External links
 for York House, St. James's Palace

Grade I listed houses in London
Houses completed in 1736
Houses in the City of Westminster
Royal buildings in London
Royal residences in the United Kingdom
St James's